Concern is a student organisation in Indian Institute of Science, which tries to generate debate on socio-politico-economic issues in the academic and scientific community of Bangalore. Over the years, it has been fairly active both at generating awareness and lending support to people's movements.

History
It was started in the year 1994 by a group of students from Indian Institute of Science who took part in the Narmada Bachao Andolan. It is still based out of Indian Institute of Science with a membership spanning across several other institutes.

Activities
Active role in social movement Narmada Bachao Andolan.
Role in Free software movement.
Role in Nonadanga Anti-eviction Struggle.
Role in raising awareness through a series of talks, panel discussions and documentary screenings.
Role in Anti-UID Aadhaar card protests.
 In 2014, Concern, along with Pedestrian Pictures, MARAA and National College, Basavanagudi organised the International Uranium Film Festival in Bangalore.

Documentaries Screened
Citizenfour : 10 April 2015
Final Solution (2003 film) by Rakesh Sharma : 31 January 2015.
Garam Hawa : 6 December 2014
Quarter No. 4/11 : 4 September 2014
Father, Son, and Holy War : 18 November 2013
Izzatnagari ki Asabhya Betiyan : 27 September 2013
Many People, Many Desires : 18 June 2013
Jai Bhim Comrade : 27 April 2013
3D Stereo Caste : 18 April 2013
Dr. Babasaheb Ambedkar : 15 April 2013
In God's Land : 19 March 2013
Inside Job : 19 December 2012
Ram Ke Naam : 12 December 2012
The Revolution will not be Televised : 20 November 2012
Death of Merit : 29 August 2012
Psywar : 6 June 2012
Nero's Guests : 3 March 2011
Mullaitivu Saga : 14 February 2011
Tales from the margins : 20 December 2010
Jashn-e-Azaadi : 15 November 2010
Radiation Stories : 10 August 2010
Red Alert: The War Within : 7 November 2009
Why We Fight (2005 film) by Eugene Jarecki : 10 November 2008.
Pee (Shit) by Amudhan R P : 26 September 2007.
Mayana Kurippugal (Notes from the Crematorium) by Amudhan R P : 26 September 2007.

Talks/Panel Discussions
9 October 2015 :Silence of Scientists-a boon for scamsters by Dr.Narendra Nayak 
24 July 2015:Science communication in Silukkapati by Prof.R.Ramanujam
26 May 2015 : New Land Acquisition Bill 2015 by  Vijoo Krishnan.
13 February 2015 : We and our Nationhood redefined by Anand Patwardhan.
22 September 2014 : Crime and Punishment by Dr. Usha Ramnathan.
12 September 2014 : Science and Society : Karnataka Anti-superstition Bill by Dr. G. Ramakrishna and Prof. R. Ramanujam.
3 July 2014 : A 'Peep' at another India by Dr. Reetika Khera.
9 April 2014 : Solidarity across Continents : Role of British Left in Indian Independence, A Talk by Prof. Andrew Thorpe.
10 February 2014 : Right to Education and Beyond by Dr. Anil Sadgopal.
28 January 2014 : Excluding farmers from agriculture!, Understanding Indian agrarian crisis and policy shifts by Dr. Vijoo Krishnan
15 January 2014 : Panel discussion on IPC 377 Judgement, Sexuality and Gender.
24 October 2013 : Sexual Harassment at workplace by Aarti Mundkur.
8 October 2013 : Reflections on present and future of nuclear technology : Development and Science in dialogue by Dr. Sabyasachi Chatterjee and Dr. Suvrat Raju.
25 July 2013 : Elusive Justice : Cases from Bijapur and Gadchiroli by Dr. Bela Bhatia.
19 July 2013 : Global recession and its Aftermath - Panel Discussion by Taki Manolakos and Prof. Srinivas Raghavendra.
27 June 2013 : Globalization and Left Politics in India by Prof. G. Haragopal.
30 May 2013 : Questions of Environment and Development by V. S. Krishna.
21 February 2013 : 'Fuelling India's Internal Wars: The Story of Chhattisgarh' by Sudha Bharadwaj.
14 September 2012 : Food Security Act: The food vs. cash debate by Dr. Reetika Khera.
3 March 2011 : Discussion with Palagummi Sainath over rising farmer suicides in India
5 December 2007 : The Global War on Terror & Human Rights Violations by Prof. B. P. Das.
17 November 2007 : Lets have a deal : A Nuclear Deal by Dr. M. V. Ramanna.
12 September 2007 : Dr. Ambedkar's vision for India: How far have we accomplished it? by Ramachandra Guha.

Issues of Concern
Issues of concern is a regular newsletter of the organisation. It covers the activities of concern and issues that need awareness.

References

Student organisations in India
Organisations based in Bangalore
1994 establishments in Karnataka
Organizations established in 1994